His Greatest Hits may refer to various compilation albums and Greatest Hits collections.

Albums with this title include:
His Greatest Hits (Elvis Presley album) 1983
His Greatest Hits, Engelbert Humperdinck 1974, remastered 1988
His Greatest Hits, Ray Charles 1992

Albums with similar titles include:
The Man in Black – His Greatest Hits, Johnny Cash album
Presents His Hits in Concert, one of the first of countless CD releases of the 1981 UK live album Glen Campbell Live
His 12 Greatest Hits, a compilation album by Neil Diamond issued in 1974 on the MCA record label
His Definitive Greatest Hits, a compilation album by American blues musician B. B. King
A Collection of His Greatest Hits, a compilation album by American recording artist Babyface released in 2000

Sings His Greatest Hits
Neil Sedaka Sings His Greatest Hits, 1963
Little Richard Sings His Greatest Hits, 1966
Billy "Crash" Craddock Sings His Greatest Hits, a greatest hits collection by the country singer, 1978
Dion (singer) Sings His Greatest Hits, 1962
George Jones Sings His Greatest Hits (Starday 1962)
Tony Williams (singer) Sings His Greatest Hits, 1962
Ernest Ashworth Sings His Greatest Hits, 1976
Grandpa Jones Sings His Greatest Hits, 1954
Colin Blunstone Sings His Greatest Hits, 1991
Frank Sinatra Sings His Greatest Hits (Columbia/Legacy, 1997)
Sings His Best Hits for Capitol Records, Ronnie Milsap

See also albums with the name of artist in title:
Glen Campbell Live! His Greatest Hits 1994
Ritchie Valens...His Greatest Hits Volume 2
Diana: Paul Anka Sings His Greatest Hits

See also
Greatest Hits (disambiguation)
Her Greatest Hits (disambiguation)
Their Greatest Hits (disambiguation)